Nicrophorus heurni is a burying beetle that lives in Australia and New Guinea.

References

Silphidae
Beetles of Australia
Beetles of Asia
Beetles described in 1926